Percussion welding (PEW) is a type of resistance welding that blends dissimilar metals together. Percussion welding creates a high temperature arc that is formed from a short quick electrical discharge. Immediately following the electrical discharge, pressure is applied which forges the materials together. This type of joining brings the materials together in a percussive manner.

Percussion welding is similar to flash welding and upset welding but is generally considered to be more complex because it uses an electric discharge at the joint, followed by pressure being applied to join the materials together. Percussion welding is used to join dissimilar metals together, or used when flash is not required at the joint. Percussion welding is used on materials that have small cross sectional areas.

Advantages of using percussion welding types include a shallow heat affected zone, and the time cycle involved is very short. Typical times can be found to be less than 16 milliseconds.

References 
 welding-engineer.blogspot.com 
 thefabricator.com 
 key-to-steel.com 
 welding-machines-equipment.com

See also
welding
Flash welding

Welding